Ladan Osman is a Somali-American poet and teacher. Her poetry is centered on her Somali and Muslim heritage, and has been published in a number of prominent literary magazines. In 2014, she was awarded the annual Sillerman First Book Prize for her collection The Kitchen Dweller's Testimony.

Personal life
Osman was born in Mogadishu, Somalia, and grew up in Columbus, Ohio in the United States.

For her post-secondary education, Osman earned a BA from Otterbein University. She subsequently studied at the University of Texas at Austin's Michener Center for Writers, where she obtained an MFA.

Additionally, Osman has received fellowships from the Fine Arts Work Center, Union League Civic & Arts Foundation, Cave Canem Foundation, and Michener Center for Writers.

As of 2014, she lives in Chicago.

Career
Osman is a teacher by profession.

Her verse has been featured in a number of poetry publications, including Narrative Magazine, Artful Dodge, Vinyl Poetry, Prairie Schooner and RHINO. Her poems have also appeared in former US Poet Laureate Ted Kooser's syndicated newspaper column, "American Life in Poetry."

Osman's poetry is shaped by her Somali and Islamic heritage. Fellow Somali author Nuruddin Farah serves as among her main artistic influences. She also cites verse by the Palestinian poet Mahmoud Darwish, the Sudanese writer Tayeb Salih, as well as the American poets Sherman Alexie, Gwendolyn Brooks and Li-Young Lee as additional inspirations.

Her chapbook, Ordinary Heaven, was released in March 2014. Her first full-length collection  The Kitchen-Dweller’s Testimony was published in 2015 and was decorated with the Sillerman First Book Prize for African Poets.

Awards
In February 2014, Osman was named the winner of the annual Sillerman First Book Prize for African Poets for her collection The Kitchen Dweller's Testimony. The $1000 award was accompanied by the publication of her poetry anthology by the University of Nebraska Press in conjunction with Amalion Press.

References

External links
Poetry Foundation - Ladan Osman

Living people
Ethnic Somali people
Somalian poets
Somalian women poets
Schoolteachers from Ohio
Somalian emigrants to the United States
Otterbein University alumni
Michener Center for Writers alumni
People from Mogadishu
American women poets
Year of birth missing (living people)
African-American Muslims
20th-century births
American women educators
21st-century American women